An Evening with Mel Tormé is a 1996 live album by Mel Tormé. This was Tormé's final recording before a stroke ended his career.

Track listing
"Just One of Those Things"/"On Green Dolphin Street" (Cole Porter)/(Bronislaw Kaper, Ned Washington) – 4:56
"You Make Me Feel So Young" (Mack Gordon, Josef Myrow) – 3:50
"A Nightingale Sang in Berkeley Square" (Eric Maschwitz, Manning Sherwin) – 4:19
"Pick Yourself Up" (Dorothy Fields, Jerome Kern) – 4:41
"Stardust" (Hoagy Carmichael, Mitchell Parish) – 5:03
"Love for Sale" (Porter) – 5:09
"Since I Fell for You" (Buddy Johnson) – 4:42
Benny Goodman medley: "Three Little Words"/"Slipped Disc"/"Smooth One"/"Rachel's Dream" (Harry Ruby, Burt Kalmar)/(Benny Goodman)/(Goodman)/(Goodman, Bert Reisfeld) – 3:09
"I Remember You"/"It's Easy to Remember (And So Hard to Forget)" (Johnny Mercer, Victor Schertzinger)/(Lorenz Hart, Richard Rodgers) – 5:07
"Lover, Come Back to Me" (Oscar Hammerstein II, Sigmund Romberg) – 3:48
"Stairway to the Stars" (Matty Malneck, Parish, Frank Signorelli) – 4:12
"Oh, Lady Be Good!" (George Gershwin, Ira Gershwin) – 3:41
"Ev'ry Time We Say Goodbye" (Porter) – 2:30

Personnel 
Mel Tormé – vocals
Mike Renzi – piano
John Leitham – double bass
Donny Osborne – drums

References

Mel Tormé live albums
1996 live albums
Concord Records live albums